Coleman Glacier may mean:

Coleman Glacier (Antarctica), on Mount Andrus
Coleman Glacier (Washington), on Mount Baker

See also
Coalman Glacier, on Mount Hood